The Serbian Sports Centre is a Serbian Australian Community centre  in Keysborough, Victoria, a suburb of Melbourne, Victoria. It is the home of Otpisani Basketball Club, White Eagles Basketball Club, and Springvale White Eagles Football Club. The ground has a capacity of 5000, with approximately 400 seats in its grandstand.

Soccer venues in Melbourne
Sports venues in Melbourne
Sport in the City of Greater Dandenong
Buildings and structures in the City of Greater Dandenong